In Amguel (Arabic: عين امقل, lit. Amguel spring) is a town and commune in Tamanrasset District, Tamanrasset Province, Algeria. According to the 2008 census it has a population of 4,208, up from 3,030 in 1998, with an annual growth rate of 3.4%. Its postal code is 11100 and its municipal code is 1109.

Geography

The numerous wadis in the area support some vegetation, but beyond them the land is barren and rocky.

In Amguel is notable for being the location of several underground nuclear tests conducted by the French military. They include the now infamous Béryl incident which released a cloud of radioactive dust outside the tunnel entrance, contaminating officials viewing the test.

Climate

In Amguel has a hot desert climate (Köppen climate classification BWh), with very hot summers and mild winters, and very little precipitation throughout the year.

Transportation

In Amguel is located on the N1 national highway, leading north to In Salah and south to Tamanrasset. Just to the south of the town, the N55 branches from the N1, leading to Bordj El Houasse.

Education

4.2% of the population has a tertiary education, and another 11.4% has completed secondary education. The overall literacy rate is 71.1%, and is 77.7% among males and 63.8% among females.

Localities
The commune is composed of eight localities:

In Amguel
In Eker
Tasnou
Maniet
Arak
Tahaggart
Région de Ahnat
Imidir

References

Neighbouring towns and cities

Communes of Tamanrasset Province
Tuareg